Ectoedemia sericopeza, the Norway maple seedminer, is a moth of the  family Nepticulidae, found in Europe and North America. It was described by the German entomologist, Philipp Christoph Zeller in 1839.

Description
The wingspan is 6–9 mm. Edward Meyrick gives this description: Head ferruginous-orange, collar ochreous-whitish. Antennal eyecaps ochreous-whitish. Forewings blackish ; a basal spot, a bent fascia before middle,a tornal spot, and opposite costal spot yellow-whitish. Hindwings grey. The moths fly in May and August.

The larvae feed on Norway maple (Acer platanoides). The mine of first generation larvae consists of a short, superficial corridor, leading towards the seed, which is eaten. Larvae of the second generation make a short mine in the bark of a petiole, and from there penetrates a bud that is consumed from the inside out.

Distribution
It is found from Fennoscandinavia to the Pyrenees, Italy, and Greece and from Great Britain to Russia and Ukraine. It is also present in North America, where it has been recorded from Delaware, Massachusetts, Ontario and Quebec.

References

External links
 Image
 Bug Guide

Nepticulidae
Leaf miners
Moths described in 1839
Moths of Europe
Moths of North America
Taxa named by Philipp Christoph Zeller